Ahernia is a genus of a single species (Ahernia glandulosa) of trees in the willow family Salicaceae found in Hainan province of China and Luzon island of the Philippines. Previously it was treated in the family Flacourtiaceae or Achariaceae. Ahernia is closely related to the American genera Hasseltia, Macrothumia, and Pleuranthodendron, but differs in its axillary racemes and more numerous (10–15) petals. Ahernia glandulosa is found in low elevation primary forests and is known in the Tagalog language as butun or sanglai.

References

Salicaceae
Monotypic Malpighiales genera
Flora of Luzon
Salicaceae genera
Trees of the Philippines
Trees of China